The 1981 European Junior Badminton Championships was the seventh edition of the European Junior Badminton Championships. It was held in Edinburgh, Scotland, in the month of April. Denmark won four disciplines, the Boys' singles and doubles, Girls' doubles and mixed team championships, while, English players secured titles in Girls' singles and Mixed doubles.

Medalists

Results

Semi-finals

Final

Medal table

References 

European Junior Badminton Championships
European Junior Badminton Championships
European Junior Badminton Championships
International sports competitions hosted by Scotland